Sarallah (also Romanized as S̄ārāllah; also known as S̄ārollāh Shāh-e Ghāleb) is a village in Tashan-e Sharqi Rural District, Tashan District, Behbahan County, Khuzestan Province, Iran. At the 2006 census, its population was 898, in 187 families.

References 

Populated places in Behbahan County